Gammaroidea is a superfamily of crustaceans in the order Amphipoda.

Families
These families belong to the superfamily Gammaroidea:

 Acanthogammaridae Garjajeff, 1901
 Anisogammaridae Bousfield, 1977
 Baikalogammaridae Kamaltynov, 2002
 Bathyporeiidae d'Udekem d'Acoz, 2011
 Behningiellidae Kamaltynov, 2002
 Carinogammaridae Tachteew, 2001 sensu Kamaltynov, 2010
 Crypturopodidae Kamaltynov, 2002
 Eulimnogammaridae Kamaltynov, 1999
 Falklandellidae Lowry & Myers, 2012
 Gammaracanthidae Bousfield, 1989
 Gammarellidae Bousfield, 1977
 Gammaridae Latreille, 1802
 Iphigenellidae Kamaltynov, 2002
 Luciobliviidae Tomikawa, 2007
 Macrohectopidae Sowinsky, 1915
 Mesogammaridae Bousfield, 1977
 Micruropodidae Kamaltynov, 1999
 Ommatogammaridae Kamaltynov, 2010
 Pachyschesidae Kamaltynov, 1999
 Pallaseidae Tachteew, 2001
 Paraleptamphopidae Bousfield, 1983
 Phreatogammaridae Bousfield, 1982
 Pontogammaridae Bousfield, 1977
 Sensonatoridae Lowry & Myers, 2012
 Typhlogammaridae Bousfield, 1978
 Zaramillidae Lowry & Myers, 2016

References

Amphipoda
Arthropod superfamilies